45 athletes (36 men and 9 women) from Switzerland competed at the 1996 Summer Paralympics in Atlanta, United States.

Medallists

See also
Switzerland at the Paralympics
Switzerland at the 1996 Summer Olympics

References 

Nations at the 1996 Summer Paralympics
1996
Summer Paralympics